Alpaslan is a given name. Notable people with the name include:

 Alpaslan Eratlı (born 1948), Turkish footballer
 Alpaslan Öztürk (born 1993), Turkish-Belgian footballer

See also
 Alparslan (disambiguation)
 Alpaslan, Taşova, a town in the district of Taşova, Amasya Province, Turkey

Turkish masculine given names